Jean-Louis Njemba Medu (1902–1966) was a Cameroonian writer. He is regarded as a pioneer of the African novel, having published the science fiction/fantasy novel Nnanga Kon in 1932 in his native Bulu language. The story deals with the encounter between the Bulu tribe and a white missionary; the title literally means "white ghosts" or "phantom albinos" in Bulu. 

More than 30 years after the author's death, the novel was translated into French by Jacques Fame Ndongo, and published by Sopecam publishers of Yaoundé in 1989.

References

1902 births
1966 deaths
20th-century male writers
20th-century novelists
Cameroonian male writers
Cameroonian novelists
Male novelists